Cola acuminata  is a species in the genus Cola, of the family Malvaceae, native to tropical Africa. It is generally known for its fruit, the kola nut, originally used to impart the cola flavor in manufactured beverages, such as Coca-Cola.

Description
The kola tree mainly inhabits lowlands, and is medium-sized with low branches, grey or dark green bark, dark green leaves, and white flowers pollinated by insects. The tree prefers moist, sandy, loam or clay soils that are well-drained with neutral acidity. It requires sun exposure and can tolerate drought.

Fruits
The seed contains 1.25 - 2.4% caffeine, and can be chewed or ground into a powder added to beverages to increase alertness, diminish fatigue, and increase stamina.

Uses
Its fruits are harvested from the forests of West Africa. The fruits contain about 2% catechin-caffeine, theobromine and kolatin. They are roasted, pounded or chewed, and can be added to drinks, such as tea or milk, or cereal such as porridge. When the whole nuts are chewed, they have a bitter flavour, but leave a sweet aftertaste that enhances flavour and sweetness of other foods in the meal.

In Africa, kola nuts may be used in traditional medicine or as a food colorant, while the wood may be used as fuel, or for making furniture, houses or boats.

Gallery

References

acuminata
Flora of West-Central Tropical Africa
Flora of West Tropical Africa
Flora of the Democratic Republic of the Congo